Roscoe Township is located in Winnebago County, Illinois. As of the 2010 census, its population was 19,694 and it contained 7,497 housing units.

Roscoe Township was named for William Roscoe, an English historian.

Geography

Demographics

References

External links
City-data.com
Winnebago County Official Site

1849 establishments in Illinois
Populated places established in 1849
Rockford metropolitan area, Illinois
Townships in Illinois
Townships in Winnebago County, Illinois